Government of the Dáil may refer to 
Government of the 1st Dáil 
Government of the 2nd Dáil 
Government of the 3rd Dáil 
Government of the 4th Dáil 
Government of the 5th Dáil 
Government of the 6th Dáil 
Government of the 7th Dáil 
Government of the 8th Dáil 
Government of the 9th Dáil 
Government of the 10th Dáil 
Government of the 11th Dáil 
Government of the 12th Dáil 
Government of the 13th Dáil 
Government of the 14th Dáil 
Government of the 15th Dáil 
Government of the 16th Dáil 
Government of the 17th Dáil 
Government of the 18th Dáil 
Government of the 19th Dáil 
Government of the 20th Dáil 
Government of the 21st Dáil
Government of the 22nd Dáil 
Government of the 23rd Dáil
Government of the 24th Dáil 
Government of the 25th Dáil 
Government of the 26th Dáil 
Government of the 27th Dáil (disambiguation), two governments by that name
Government of the 28th Dáil 
Government of the 29th Dáil 
Government of the 30th Dáil 
Government of the 31st Dáil